Samir Galloul (born October 18, 1976 in Oran, Bouzaréah) is an Algerian footballer. He currently plays for NA Hussein Dey in the Algerian Championnat National.

External links
 

1976 births
Algerian footballers
Algeria international footballers
Living people
Footballers from Algiers
USM Blida players
MC Alger players
NA Hussein Dey players
Association football defenders
21st-century Algerian people